Vashegy is a Hungarian name of the following places, which were all formerly within the Hungarian part of the Austro-Hungarian Empire:
 Dealu Ferului, a village in the commune of Vințu de Jos in Alba County, Romania
 Železník (village), in the Svidník District of the Prešov Region of Slovakia
 Železna Gora, a village in the municipality of Štrigova in Međimurje County, Croatia
 Vas-hegy, a mountain in the Alpokalja mountain range on the border between Vas County, Hungary, and Burgenland, Austria

See also
 Eisenberg (disambiguation), a German equivalent place name
 György Vashegyi (born 1970), Hungarian harpsichordist and conductor